The Samara Mosque in Samara is one of the largest mosques in Russia. It was built in the late 1990s in red brick. The main dome is 13.5 meters in diameter. The minaret rises to a height of 67 meters. The building was designed by Rasim Walshin, an architect from Samara. There is an apple orchard by the walls. The New Mosque should not be confused with the pre-revolutionary mosque dating back to 1891.

See also
Islam in Russia
List of mosques in Russia
List of mosques in Europe

References 

Buildings and structures in Samara, Russia
Mosques in Russia
Mosques completed in the 1990s
Mosques in Europe
Mosque buildings with domes